Martti Henrik Jukola (22 October 1900 – 3 October 1952) was a Finnish sports journalist and athlete. He was a pioneer in Finnish radio for his on the field reporting at sports events. Jukola was a hurdler and participated in the 1924 Summer Olympics.

Early life and education
Martti Jukola was born in Turku in 1900. His parents were Aapo Henrik Jukola and Maria Wilhelmina Grönroos. In 1922, he graduated with his Bachelor of Arts and in 1932 received his PhD. The subject of his doctoral thesis was J. H. Erkko.

Career

In 1922, he became assistant editor of Urheilulehti. He then became corresponding editor in chief in 1931. While working at Urheilulehti, he also served as literary officer of WSOY. He also published work in Kansan Kuvalehti and Urheilija. He started working for Yle in 1931 as a commentator. From 1939 until 1942 he was head of the sports department. He founded the Ylä-Vuoksen Palloseura.

As an athlete, the height of his track and field career was in the 1920s. His home sports club was Turun Urheiluliitto. He finished fifth in hurdling at the 1924 Summer Olympics in the semi-finals. He moved to Turku and was represented by Porvoon Urheilijat and Helsingin Kisa-Veikot. He was made an honorary member of the later.

Later life

He died in 1952 in Helsinki.

Works
 Olympialaiskisat I-III 1924–1928
 Olympialaispoikia 1928
 Juhana Heikki Erkko. Elämä ja teokset, osa I (väitöskirja) 1930 ja osa II 1939
 Me uskomme urheiluun 1932
 Athletics in Finland 1932
 Huippu-urheilun historiaa (useita painoksia) 1. 1935
 Laakeriseppele. Pyrähdyksiä kotimaassa ja maailmalla. Urheiluselostajan muistelmia 1943
 Urheilun pikku jättiläinen ohjekirja nuorille urheilijoille, tietokirja kaikille urheilunharrastajille (1945–1947, useita painoksia)
 Urheileva nuoriso 1948
 Suuri Olympiakirja 1952

References

Sources
 Kuka kukin oli (Wikiaineisto)
 Antti O. Arponen, Matti Hannus, Juha Kanerva: Martti Jukola - Suomen urheilun suuri tulkki, Juva: WS Bookwell Oy, 2000. .
 Markku Siukonen: Suuri olympiateos 12. Keuruu: Otava, 2001. . s.97.

Footnotes

1900 births
1952 deaths
Sportspeople from Turku
Athletes from Helsinki
Finnish sports broadcasters
Finnish male hurdlers
Athletes (track and field) at the 1924 Summer Olympics
Olympic athletes of Finland
Sportswriters